Silvani is a surname of Italian origin. There are approximately 1516 people with the surname in Italy, the largest number in Emilia Romagna, in Bagno di Romagna, Sarsina, Bologna, and Pieve Santo Stefano, near Arezzo, Tuscany. A considerable number is  found in Milan. There are approximately 300 Silvani in France, 350 in USA and 24 in the UK. The surname derives from Latin silva (“forest”) and could have been used by the Romans to refer to their slaves that had Transylvanian origin (Romania/Hungary)
The name refers to:
Al Silvani (1910–1996), American boxing trainer, actor, and stunt man
Aldo Silvani (1891–1964), Italian film actor
Gherardo Silvani (1579–1675), Florentine architect and sculptor of the Baroque era who built Villa di Uligliano also in Tuscany
Mary Silvani (1948–1982), American murder victim
Pier Francesco Silvani (1620–1685), Florentine architect of the Baroque era
Walter Silvani (born 1971) Argentine footballer

Fictional characters
Marco Silvani, character on Australian soap opera Neighbours

Signorina Silvani and accountant Ugo Fantozzi, a fictional character
Written by Paolo Villaggio for the Italian Television